Gephyrina is a genus of running crab spiders that was first described by Eugène Louis Simon in 1895.

Species
 it contains five species, found in Bolivia, Brazil, Venezuela, and on the Windward Islands:
Gephyrina alba Simon, 1895 (type) – Venezuela
Gephyrina albimarginata Mello-Leitão, 1929 – Brazil
Gephyrina imbecilla Mello-Leitão, 1917 – Brazil
Gephyrina insularis Simon, 1898 – St. Vincent
Gephyrina nigropunctata Mello-Leitão, 1929 – Brazil, Bolivia

See also
 List of Philodromidae species

References

Araneomorphae genera
Philodromidae
Spiders of South America